SOASC may refer to:
 Stone Oakvalley's Authentic SID Collection
 Sultan Omar Ali Saifuddien College, a secondary school in Brunei